Cirilo Etulain was an Argentine stage and film actor. He was married to the opera singer Noemí Souza.

Selected filmography
 Educating Niní (1940)
 By the Light of a Star (1941)
 The Song of the Suburbs (1941)
 The Three Rats (1946)
 The Naked Angel (1946)
 From Man to Man (1949)
 The Bohemian Soul (1949)

References

Bibliography
 Alma Vélez. Juan Carlos Thorry, un talentoso seductor: memorias. Corregidor, 2004.

External links

Year of birth unknown
1963 deaths
Argentine male film actors
Argentine male radio actors
Argentine male stage actors
Argentine people of Basque descent